The following is a list of incorporated places in the United States with a population density of over 10,000 people per square mile. As defined by the United States Census Bureau, an incorporated place is a place that has a self-governing local government and as such has been "incorporated" by the state it is in. Each state has different laws defining how a place can be incorporated. An "incorporated place" as recognized by the U.S. Census Bureau can designate a variety of places, such as a city, town, village, borough, and township.

The other type of place defined by the U.S. Census Bureau for statistical purposes are census-designated places. Census-designated places are distinct from incorporated places because they do not have a local government and thus depend on higher government bodies, such as a county, for governance. Census-designated places are defined as being in an unincorporated area. Census-designated places that have a population density of over 10,000 people per square mile are listed in a separate table below. The five boroughs of New York City, and the census-designated places of Puerto Rico and the Northern Mariana Islands that have densities over 10,000, are also listed in separate tables below.

Incorporated places with a density of over 10,000 people per square mile
The following data about the most densely populated incorporated places in the United States is from the U.S. Census Bureau and is from the 2010 U.S. Census, except for the tables on Puerto Rico, which show data from the 2000 US Census. The following ranking is made up of incorporated places of any population, but also of interest may be lists compiled by the U.S. Census Bureau of all places with at least 50,000 population, arranged alphabetically by state, and ranked by total population; the population density for each place is also given in the lists.

The population density is calculated by dividing the population by the land area so that it represents the number of people living in one square mile of land area. The population densities listed in the table below do not work out to be exactly the result of dividing the listed population by the listed land area because the land areas have been rounded off to two decimal places, but the population densities were calculated before rounding the land area figures. The land area figures are calculated using the U.S. Census Bureau's TIGER system. The U.S. Census Bureau has released the exact land area figures for all places in the U.S. in square meters and square miles; the exact land areas are the figures used for calculating the population densities seen in the table below.

The list below only includes incorporated places of the 50 states and the District of Columbia. Unincorporated census-designated places, places in Puerto Rico, and the five boroughs of New York City are all listed in separate tables below. Washington, D.C. misses the 10,000 mark as the city has a population density of 9,800 people per square mile as of the 2010 U.S. Census.

Those cities that are not a part of a larger city's metropolitan area are in bold.

Census-designated places
The following is a list of unincorporated census-designated places with population densities of over 10,000 people per square mile as of the 2010 U.S. Census. The rank column indicates the rank the place would have if census-designated places were included in the above table of incorporated places.

New York City boroughs
The following lists the population densities of the five boroughs of New York City as of the 2010 U.S. Census. The rank column indicates the rank they would have if included in the above table of incorporated places. Staten Island has a population density below 10,000, but it is included for comparative purposes.

Puerto Rico

The following lists the census-designated places in Puerto Rico that have a population density of over 10,000 people per square mile as of the 2000 U.S. Census. The census-designated places in Puerto Rico include zonas urbanas (urban areas) and comunidades (communities). The municipality, or municipio, the place is located in is also included in the table below. The municipalities are what is thought of as "incorporated places" in Puerto Rico because there are no subordinate governments within them, only eight electoral districts which hold no administrative functions (the electoral districts are what generally constitute the census-designated places in this list below). No municipalities have a density over 10,000 as of the 2000 U.S. Census; the San Juan Municipio is the densest at 9,084.4 people per square mile. The Jayuya municipality is not part of any metropolitan area as it is only part of the Jayuya micropolitan area (see Puerto Rico census statistical areas). The rank column indicates the rank the place would have if included in the above table of incorporated places.

Northern Mariana Islands

In the Northern Mariana Islands, there is one place that has more than 10,000 people per square mile: China Town, Northern Mariana Islands (in the 2010 U.S. Census). The other non-Puerto Rico U.S. territories (American Samoa, Guam and the U.S. Virgin Islands) do not have any places with more than 10,000 people per square mile (as of the 2010 U.S. Census). China Town, Northern Mariana Islands is a census-designated place; it is also a village within the larger municipality of Saipan. China Town would rank 105th if it were in the first table above.

List of incorporated cities in the United States with over 75,000 residents

Below is a list of the most densely populated cities in the United States which have a population density over 10,000 people per square mile and have a total population of over 75,000 according to the 2010 Census. This list relates to the first list, but excludes cities under 75,000. 

Those cities not a part of a larger city's metropolitan area in bold.

Distributions
The following distributions only include the 125 incorporated places with population densities over 10,000 people per square mile. They do not include the 36 census-designated places, the boroughs of New York City, or the 11 places in Puerto Rico with densities over 10,000.

Metropolitan areas
The following ranks United States metropolitan areas by the number of incorporated places with densities over 10,000 within them. If two or more metropolitan areas have the same number of incorporated places, as is the case of the eight metros with one place, the metro areas are ranked by the densest incorporated place within the metro area.

States and territories

The following ranks the 50 U.S. states, the District of Columbia, and the 5 inhabited U.S. territories by the number of incorporated places with densities over 10,000 people within them. The "10,000+ places" column only includes incorporated places, it does not include census-designated places (CDPs). If two or more states have the same number of places, as is the case of the 36 states that contain no incorporated places with a density over 10,000, the states are ranked by the densest incorporated place within the state. The density figures for the densest incorporated place within each state and territory are from the 2010 United States Census, and all the data for this ranking is from the U.S. Census Bureau.

The first rank column ranks each state by the number of 10,000+ places in that state (New Jersey ranks first, California ranks second, etc.) The second rank column ranks the most densely populated place in each state or territory (Guttenberg, NJ ranks first, Kaser, NY ranks second, etc.)

Hawaii officially does not contain any incorporated places, as the city of Honolulu is coextensive with Honolulu County, which makes up the whole island of Oahu. When the U.S. Census Bureau ranks incorporated places by population, it usually includes the Honolulu census-designated place, which is the urban center of Honolulu, in its ranking of incorporated places. Therefore, for this list of the densest incorporated places by state, the Honolulu CDP is considered the densest incorporated place in Hawaii. The District of Columbia, Puerto Rico and the U.S. territories are also included in this list. Puerto Rico also officially does not contain any incorporated places, as the lowest form of local government in Puerto Rico are the municipios, which are equivalent to counties. For this ranking, the municipios are counted as the incorporated places in Puerto Rico, and the San Juan Municipio is the densest.

In American Samoa, each village is governed by a pulenu'u (the equivalent of a mayor) — as such, each village in American Samoa can be considered to be incorporated for the purposes of the table below. In the Northern Mariana Islands, each municipality (such as Saipan) is governed by a mayor, and so those municipalities can be considered incorporated — the villages in the Northern Mariana Islands are considered Census-Designated Places. In Guam, each village is governed by a mayor, and so those villages can be considered incorporated. For the purposes of the table below, the major towns of the U.S. Virgin Islands (Charlotte Amalie, Frederiksted and Christiansted) are considered to be incorporated.

Note: this table contains data from the 2010 U.S. Census — because of this, data is more than 9 years old, and the current population density of each jurisdiction may have changed since then.

Populations

New York City, Chicago, and Philadelphia are the only incorporated places in the United States that have a population over 1,000,000 and a population density over 10,000 people per square mile.

Land areas

Population densities

See also

United States of America
Outline of the United States
Index of United States-related articles
United States Census Bureau
Demographics of the United States
List of US states and territories by population
List of US cities by population
Lists of US cities and metropolitan areas
United States Office of Management and Budget
Statistical area (United States)
Combined statistical area (list)
Core-based statistical area (list)
Metropolitan statistical area (list)
Micropolitan statistical area (list)
List of United States urban areas – lists contiguous urban areas without regard to municipal boundaries, includes the population density of each urban area
County statistics of the United States – includes a list of the 50 most densely populated counties
List of U.S. states by population density
Worldwide
 List of cities by population density
 List of countries and dependencies by population density
 List of the most densely populated country subdivisions

Notes

References

External links
 
 Density Using Land Area For States, Counties, Metropolitan Areas, and Places – from the U.S. Census Bureau, various tables and maps from the 2000 U.S. Census and 1990 U.S. Census of population density statistics
 2000 Census: US Municipalities Over 50,000: Ranked by 2000 Density – from Demographia, ranks the population density for all incorporated places over 50,000 population from the 2000 U.S. Census. Note that this list does not contain townships (see the Notes section above for a detailed explanation), and does not contain census-designated places.
 US Cities: Ranked by Density: 1990 – from Demographia, ranks all places in the U.S., including incorporated places and census-designated places (CDPs), with population densities over 10,000 people per square mile in 1990
 City Ranks – Population Density Mashup – combines Google Maps and data from the 2000 U.S. Census to show the population density of various ZIP codes on an interactive map

Lists by population density
 
Cities By Population Density